Fermoy GAA is a Gaelic Athletic Association based in the town of Fermoy, Cork, Ireland. The club fields teams in competitions organized by the Cork GAA county board and the Avondhu GAA divisional board. The club plays both Gaelic football and hurling.

History
Fermoy Gaelic Athletic Association club was founded in 1886 at a meeting in the National League Rooms (now called Fermoy Commercial club in O'Neill Crowley Quay or present home to the Fermoy Bridge club). William Troy was the club's first chairman. He was also one of the Munster delegates to the second All-Ireland Congress held in Thurles in 1887, and was elected one of the first Vice-Presidents of the GAA National Executive Body.

Clondulane village in the suburbs of Fermoy was the hub of Fermoy teams at that time, due to the large employment available at the Flour Mills which were situated there for many years.

Achievements
 Cork Senior Football Championship (7): 1895, 1989, 1899, 1990, 1905, 1906, 1945
 Cork Premier Intermediate Football Championship (1): 2018 (Runners-Up 2016)
 Munster Intermediate Club Football Championship (0): (Runners-Up 2018)
 Cork Intermediate Football Championship (3): 1915, 1932, 2015 
 Cork Premier Intermediate Hurling Championship (0): (Runners-Up 2016)
 Cork Intermediate Hurling Championship (1): 2014
 Munster Junior Club Hurling Championship (0): (Runners-Up 2009)
 Cork Junior Football Championship (5): 1898, 1899, 1909, 1936, 1974
 Cork Junior Hurling Championship (1): 2009
 Cork Minor Football Championship (2): 1923, 1953
 Cork Minor A Hurling Championship (1): 2005
 Cork Under-21 Hurling Championship (1): 1986
 North Cork Junior A Football Championship (7): 1926, 1936, 1941, 1974, 1993, 1997, 2003
 North Cork Junior A Hurling Championship (6): 1941, 1964, 1987, 1990, 1994, 1999

Notable players

 Dave Magnier
 Dave Roche
 Andy Scannell
 Eoin Clancy
 Tom Bermingham 
 Bobby Dineen

References

External links
Fermoy GAA Facebook page

Gaelic games clubs in County Cork
Gaelic football clubs in County Cork
Hurling clubs in County Cork